Sally Fletcher-Murchison is an American ceramic artist who was born in Sacramento, California in 1933.  She grew up there and received a Bachelor of Fine Art (BFA) in advertising art from the University of California, Los Angeles in 1955.  She worked as a designer before moving to Hawaii.  She studied ceramics at the University of Hawaii, where she received a Master of Fine Art (MFA) in 1966.  She has taught at the Hawaii Potters’ Guild, the University of Hawaii Lab School, the Hickam Airforce Base Craft Center and the Honolulu Museum of Art.  She is known for her massive hand-built stoneware sculptures that resemble pots, but are nonfunctional, such as End Without End in the collection of the Honolulu Museum of Art.

The Hawaii State Art Museum and the Honolulu Museum of Art are among the public collections holding work by Sally Fletcher-Murchison.

References 

 Honolulu Advertiser, "'Personalities' surveys humanity's highs, lows", Sunday, September 14, 2003.
 Yoshihara, Lisa A., Collective Visions, 1967–1997, Hawaii State Foundation on Culture and the Arts, Honolulu, Hawaii, 1997, 105.

Footnotes 

1933 births
American potters
American women ceramists
American women sculptors
Ceramists from Hawaii
Living people
Women potters
21st-century American women artists
21st-century ceramists
University of Hawaiʻi at Mānoa alumni